Vasili Vladimirovich Ivanov (born 21 March 1970) is a Russian football official and a former player. He was widely regarded as one of the most influential foreign signings during his stint in Israel with Maccabi Haifa.

Honours
 Soviet Top League champion: 1991.
 Soviet Top League runner-up: 1990.
 Soviet Cup winner: 1991.
 Soviet Cup finalist: 1990.
 Russian Cup finalist: 1993, 1994.

European club competitions
 UEFA Cup 1989–90 with FC Zenit Leningrad: 3 games.
 UEFA Champions League 1992–93 with PFC CSKA Moscow: 7 games.

References

External links
 

1970 births
Footballers from Saint Petersburg
Living people
Russian footballers
Association football midfielders
Association football defenders
Soviet footballers
Soviet Top League players
Russian Premier League players
FC Zenit Saint Petersburg players
PFC CSKA Moscow players
FC Chernomorets Novorossiysk players
Maccabi Haifa F.C. players
Maccabi Herzliya F.C. players
Russian expatriate footballers
Expatriate footballers in Israel
FC Volgar Astrakhan players